Chaigoubu is a township-level division of Huai'an County, Zhangjiakou, Hebei, China. It is also the seat of the People's government of Huai'an County.

See also
List of township-level divisions of Hebei

References

Township-level divisions of Hebei
Zhangjiakou